Burma Road Nature Reserve is a conservation area in the City of Greater Geraldton local government area of Western Australia. It is a C-class reserve and covers an area of  It is predominantly kwongan scrub-heath, typical of the Tathra Vegetation system of Beard and Burns. Almost all the native vegetation within a  radius of the reserve has been cleared. There is only 11% of native vegetation remaining in the area (1256.6 km2), of which most is within the reserve.

Notable species in the reserve include Grevillea hirtella.

References

Mid West (Western Australia)
Nature reserves in Western Australia